is a public greenspace in the quarter of Saint-Clair in the commune Caluire-et-Cuire near Lyon.

It was designed by landscape architect Alain Provost.

See also 
 Parks in Lyon

References

External links 
 

Parks in Lyon